Roman Vyacheslavovych Zozulya (born 17 November 1989) is a Ukrainian professional footballer who plays as a striker for Spanish club Rayo Majadahonda.

He played in the Ukrainian Premier League for Dynamo Kyiv and Dnipro. In 2016 he moved to Spain, playing six La Liga games for Real Betis before featuring in over 150 Segunda División games for Albacete and Fuenlabrada

Zozulya made his international debut for Ukraine in 2010. He was part of their squad at UEFA Euro 2016.

Club career

Dynamo Kyiv
Born in Kyiv, Zozulya was a product of the Dynamo youth system progressing through Dynamo-3 and Dynamo-2. In 2008, after the 2007–08 season he was promoted to the main team.

Dnipro Dnipropetrovsk
On 27 February 2014, in a Europa League match against Tottenham Hotspur, Zozulya was sent off after he directed a head-butt towards Jan Vertonghen. Zozulya was sent off and had to be restrained from attacking Vertonghen, who was accused of faking the degree of contact. Tottenham went on to win the game 3–1, knocking Dnipro out.

Betis
On 27 July 2016, Zozulya signed a three-year contract with La Liga side Real Betis. He made his debut on 11 September in a 3–2 win at Valencia CF, as an 80th-minute substitute for Álex Alegría. He played six games, starting once on 22 January in a goalless draw at home to Sporting Gijón.

Rayo Vallecano
On 31 January 2017, Zozulya joined Rayo Vallecano on loan until the end of the season. His arrival was met with protests from the club's fans, unhappy over his purported far-right links after a picture of him wearing a shirt with the Tryzub and lyrics of poet Taras Shevchenko was featuring the logo of the Right Sector. Zozulya vehemently denied any such links in an open letter to Rayo's fans, declaring that he has only assisted the legitimate Ukrainian army during the Russian military intervention in Ukraine. On 1 February 2017, Zozulya had his contract cancelled due to the reactions of Rayo fans and returned to Betis. This meant that he could not play anymore in the 2016–17 season because the Royal Spanish Football Federation rules say players cannot register for more than two teams in one campaign.

Albacete
On 8 September 2017, free agent Zozulya signed a one-year contract with Albacete Balompié. On 25 March 2019, Zozulya endured more harassment during an Albacete away game against Lugo, when the fans of the latter club sang chants aimed at Zozulya, explicitly wishing him death for supposedly supporting the Nazi political movement. As a result of the incident, the fans of Albacete requested that La Liga seriously punish Lugo. Zozulya received the best player award for the month of October 2019, based on the fans' votes. On 15 December 2019, the league game between Rayo Vallecano and Albacete was abandoned by the referee, after abuse and threats from the home fans over Zozulya's alleged far-right-wing political views. The second half of the game was scheduled to be played the following June, following the resumption of football after the coronavirus pandemic.

Fuenlabrada
On 31 July 2021, after Albas relegation, Zozulya signed a two-year contract with fellow second division side CF Fuenlabrada.

Rayo Majadahonda
On 8 December 2022, Zozulya signed for Primera Federación club Rayo Majadahonda on a deal until the end of the 2022–23 season.

International career
Zozulya debuted for Ukraine on 2 June 2010 against Norway at Ullevaal Stadion in Oslo. He scored a goal after Yevhen Konoplyanka fired a long shot at Jon Knudsen, who fumbled with the ball and let Zozulya kick the ball into the net. He was substituted in the 81st minute. He was member of the Ukrainian 23-man squad for Euro 2016.

Outside of football

Civil involvement

Zozulya is the founder of the Narodna Armiya (People's Army) organisation which is a part of the civil volunteer movement helping Ukrainian forces in the war in Donbass. In particular Zozulya's organisation is providing food, clothing and technical equipment to Ukrainian Army and helps families of the military. In 2016, he received a special commendation from the Ministry of Defense of Ukraine for his support to the Armed Forces of Ukraine.

Together with Ruslan Rotan Zozulya is also the co-founder and sponsor of the Rotan and Zozulya Academy of Football in Dnipro.

Accusations of Nazi sympathies
In December 2019, a match between the Spanish teams Rayo Vallecano and Albacete (Roman Zozulya's former and current clubs) was suspended, when the former club's fans loudly accused the player of being a sympathizer of Nazi ideology, due to his known support of the Azov Battalion, as well as other images he had posted on his Twitter account, which contained references to Nazi symbolism or organizations claimed to support Nazism.

Personal life
His sister Olena is married with another Ukrainian football player Kyrylo Kovalets.

Career statistics

Club

International

International goals
Source:

Honors
Dynamo Kyiv
 Ukrainian Premier League: 2008–09
 Ukrainian Super Cup: 2009, 2011

FC Dnipro Dnipropetrovsk
UEFA Europa League: runner-up 2014–15

Orders

 : Decoration of the President of Ukraine for Humanitarian Participation in the Anti-Terrorist Operation
 : Honorary badge of the Chief of General Staff for Services to the Armed Forces of Ukraine

References

External links

 

 

1989 births
Footballers from Kyiv
Association football forwards
FC Dnipro players
FC Dynamo Kyiv players
Living people
Ukraine international footballers
Ukraine youth international footballers
Ukraine under-21 international footballers
Ukrainian footballers
Ukrainian Premier League players
Ukrainian First League players
Ukrainian Second League players
FC Dynamo-2 Kyiv players
FC Dynamo-3 Kyiv players
UEFA Euro 2016 players
La Liga players
Segunda División players
Real Betis players
Rayo Vallecano players
Albacete Balompié players
CF Fuenlabrada footballers
CF Rayo Majadahonda players
Ukrainian expatriate footballers
Ukrainian expatriate sportspeople in Spain
Expatriate footballers in Spain